The PlayStation 3 technical specifications describe the various components of the PlayStation 3 (PS3) video game console.

Central processing unit

The PS3 uses the Cell microprocessor, which is made up of one 3.2 GHz PowerPC-based "Power Processing Element" (PPE) and six accessible Synergistic Processing Elements (SPEs). A seventh runs in a special mode and is dedicated to aspects of the OS and security, and an eighth is a spare to improve production yields. PlayStation 3's Cell CPU achieves a theoretical maximum of 179.2 GFLOPS in single precision floating point operations and up to 15 GFLOPS double precision.

The PS3 has 256 MB of Rambus XDR DRAM, clocked at CPU die speed. The PPE has 64 KB L1 cache and 512 KB L2 cache, while the SPEs have 2 MB local memory (256 KB per SPE), connected by the Element Interconnect Bus (EIB) with up to 307.2 Gbit/s bandwidth.

Graphics processing unit

According to Nvidia, the RSX — the graphics processing unit (GPU) — is based on the NVIDIA G70 (previously known as NV47) architecture. The GPU is clocked at  500 MHz and makes use of 256 MB GDDR3 RAM clocked at  650 MHz with an effective transmission rate of 1.3 GHz. The RSX has a floating-point performance of 192 GFLOPS.

Configurations

The PS3 received several component revisions which served to reduce power consumption. This in turn resulted in production savings, lower heat production, lower cooling requirements and quieter operation. Since launch, the Cell processor shrank from 90 nm to 45 nm. The RSX GPU also saw reduction in size over periodic revisions of the PS3.

Major improvements were introduced with the PS3 Slim. It utilizes a 45 nm Cell which results in a 34% reduction in power consumption over the previous 65 nm Cell model; the last Slim model further decreases power consumption with the move to a 40 nm RSX and later 28 nm on the CECH-43xx models.

Model numbers
On all models of the PS3, the last seven characters of the serial number make up the console's model number. This begins with "CECH", followed by a letter indicating what model the system is. The last two characters of the model number indicate what region the system is from.

Region codes

Connectivity

In terms of audio, the PS3 supports a number of formats, including 7.1 digital audio, Dolby TrueHD, DTS-HD Master Audio and others; audio output is possible over stereo RCA cables (analog), optical digital cables, or HDMI. The PS3 slim features an upgraded HDMI chip that allows bitstreaming of lossless audio codecs to an external receiver (earlier versions had to decode the signal internally before outputting it via LPCM).

In the early 60 GB (1 GB = 1 billion bytes) and 80 GB configurations, flash memory can also be used, either Memory Sticks; CompactFlash cards; or SD/MMC cards. All models support USB memory devices; flash drives and external hard drives are both automatically recognized. However, they must be formatted with the FAT32 file system.

Earlier systems supported up to four USB 2.0 ports at the front (20 and 60 GB models, as well as the NTSC 80 GB), but the 40 GB and 80 GB PAL models only have two USB ports. All models released after August 2008 have been reduced to two USB ports at the front, as well as dropping CompactFlash and SD card support.

For networking, all models provide one Gigabit Ethernet (10/100/1000) RJ45 port.

Bluetooth 2.0 support, and built-in 802.11b/g Wi-Fi (except CECHBxx).

Physical appearance 

The original PlayStation 3's case was designed by Teiyu Goto of Sony, and uses the same typeface as the marketing materials for the film Spider-Man 3. It has a glossy piano-black finish, and the power and eject buttons are touch-sensitive.

The PlayStation 3 Slim is quieter and more compact than its predecessor. The engraved logo is an update of the PS2's with curved edges.

The PlayStation 3 Super Slim weighs at least 25% less than the Slim due in part to the slot-loading Blu-ray drive being replaced with a top-load disc reader similar to the original PlayStation's, but with a sliding cover.

Power consumption 
The power consumption of the initial PlayStation 3 units, based on 90 nm Cell CPU, ranges from 170–200 W during normal use, despite having a 380 W power supply.

The power consumption of newer 40 GB PlayStation 3 units (65 nm process Cell/90 nm RSX), ranges from 120-140 W during normal use.

The power consumption of  "slim" PlayStation 3 (45 nm process Cell/40 nm RSX) ranges from 65 to 84 W during normal use.

Universal power supply
The power supply can operate on both 60 Hz and 50 Hz power grids. It uses a standard IEC 60320 C14 (IEC 60320 C8 for the PS3 slim) connector and a C13 (C7 for the PS3 slim) power cord appropriate for the region it is being used in. The power supply on the "fat" model is 380 W. This was reduced to 250 W in the 120 GB "Slim" model. PS3 Slim models have labels indicating localized input requirements for power (120 V 60 Hz for North American and Japanese models and 220-240 V 50 Hz for European and Australian models), however teardowns have revealed the Slim power supplies are still universal.

Disc drive
The PlayStation 3 disc drive is an all-in-one type allowing the use of different formats.

BD
Blu-ray disc read speed maximum is 2× (72 Mbit/s [8.58 MB/s]) (1 Mbit = 1 million bits), region coded type allowing the use of:
 PlayStation 3 BD-ROM (Blu-Ray region matched)
 BD-ROM (Blu-ray region matched)
 BD-R
 BD-RE (not compatible with BD-RE version 1.0)

DVD
DVD disc read speed maximum is 8× (86.40 Mbit/s [10.3 MB/s]), region coded type allowing the use of:
 PlayStation 2 DVD-ROM (PlayStation region matched, i.e., NTSC-J, NTSC-U/C, PAL or NTSC-C; 20 GB, 60 GB, and 80 GB models only)
 DVD-ROM
 DVD-Video (DVD region matched, i.e., Zone 1, Zone 2, etc., and All)
 DVD-Audio (DVD-Video content only)
 DVD+R
 DVD+RW
 DVD-R
 DVD-RW
 AVCHD
 DSD Disc
 DualDisc
 Super Audio CD (20 GB, 60 GB and 80 GB models only)

CD
Compact disc read speed maximum is 24× (29.49 Mbit/s [3.51 MB/s]), region coded type allowing the use of:
 PlayStation 2 CD-ROM (PlayStation region matched, i.e., NTSC-J, NTSC-U/C, PAL or NTSC-C; 20 GB, 60 GB and 80 GB models only)
 PlayStation CD-ROM (PlayStation region matched, i.e., NTSC-J, NTSC-U or PAL)
 CD-ROM
 CD-R
 CD-RW
 CD-DA
 MP3 CD (MP3, WMA, ATRAC)

Official accessories

The PlayStation 3 Sixaxis is a controller that is very similar in appearance to that of its predecessors, the DualShock and DualShock 2. The SIXAXIS features finer analog sensitivity; more trigger-like R2 and L2 buttons; a PS ("home") button; and a USB mini-B port for charging the internal battery and for wired play. The PlayStation 3 supports up to 7 simultaneous controllers over Bluetooth. The Sixaxis is named for its ability to detect motion in the full six degrees. The Sixaxis controller also has no vibration feature.

At its press conference at the 2007 Tokyo Game Show, Sony announced the DualShock 3 (trademarked DUALSHOCK 3), a PlayStation 3 controller with the same function and design as the Sixaxis, but with vibration capability. Hands-on accounts describe the controller as being slightly heavier than the standard Sixaxis controller, and capable of vibration forces comparable to the DualShock 2.

The PlayStation 3 Memory Card Adaptor is a device that allows data to be transferred from PlayStation and PlayStation 2 memory cards to the PlayStation 3's hard disk. The device has a cable that connects to the PS3's USB port on one end, and features a legacy PS2 memory card port on the other end.

Using Bluetooth, the PlayStation 3 BD Remote allows users to control videos and music on Blu-ray Disc and DVD. In Japan, the device was available starting December 7, 2006. The PS3 will accept signals only via its Bluetooth Remote, as the console does not have an infrared receiver; this prevents the use of universal remotes with the system. The Blu-ray Disc movie Talladega Nights: The Ballad of Ricky Bobby was included with the initial 400,000 release copies of the PS3 in North America, while the first 500,000 European PlayStation Network activations after launch received a free copy of the Blu-ray release of Casino Royale.

On April 25, 2007, Sony announced the PlayStation Eye. This is an updated version of the PlayStation 2 peripheral, the EyeToy. The camera is capable of capturing 60 frames per second video at 640×480 resolution and 120 frame/s video at 320×240 resolution. The four-channel microphone on the Eye can block out background noise. The camera supports live video chat and voice chat without a headset, and was launched in the United States on October 23, 2007, for US$39.99, and in Australia on November 8, 2007, for A$79.95. It was also bundled with the card game The Eye of Judgment released in the United States on the same day as the camera itself for US$69.99, and in Japan and Australia on October 25, 2007, for JP¥9,980 and A$159.95, respectively.

Official PlayStation 3 HDMI and Component AV cables are also available for retail.

Backward compatibility
The PlayStation 3 does not include interfaces for legacy PlayStation peripherals, though IGN.com tested a legacy controller using a PS2-to-USB adapter, finding that it is compatible, though most other devices (such as the Guitar Hero controller) may not be compatible. However, with the release of firmware 1.70 for the PlayStation 3, Sony has added support for previous Guitar Hero controllers with generic PS2-to-USB adapters (although the whammy bar is not functional). Nyko started production on the "Play Adaptor", a PS2-to-USB adapter allowing for guitars and other PlayStation 2 peripherals to be used on the PlayStation 3 and was scheduled for release in Q2/2007, but Nyko stated at the end of March that the production of this device had been postponed due to compatibility problems with the PS3. The PS3 supports both the USB EyeToy camera/webcam and SOCOM Headset for video and voice chat. A memory card adapter is available so users can copy their old PS/PS2 game saves to a virtual memory card on the PS3's hard drive. The PlayStation 3 can also use Memory Sticks to store and save data for PlayStation and PlayStation 2 software. New PlayStation 3 systems no longer support PS2 playback (whether through use of the Emotion Engine and Graphics Synthesizer hardware or through the Graphics Synthesizer and software emulation of the Emotion Engine using the Cell Broadband Engine).

See also
 PlayStation technical specifications
 PlayStation 2 technical specifications
 PlayStation 4 technical specifications

References

External links

Official websites
 Australia • Canada •  • United Kingdom • United States

 Auxiliary sites by Sony
 Hardware Press Images • Features and promotion site • User's Guide • Support

Directories
 

Products introduced in 2006
Technical specifications
PowerPC-based video game consoles
Video game hardware